Khambi may refer to the following villages:

 Khambi, Pakistan, in Punjab, Pakistan
 Khambi, Haryana, in India
 Khambi, Manipur, in India